Pointe-au-Chien Tribe is a State-recognized Native American Tribe, located in Terrebonne and Lafourche Parishes, Louisiana.  Pointe-au-Chien Tribe claim to be descendants of the Chitimacha; they are also believed to be descendants of other historical tribes located in the region, notably the Acolapissa, Atakapas, coastal Choctaw and Biloxi Indians.  The Tribe has approximately 800 members. In 1996, they have petitioned to the United States Bureau of Indian Affairs for federal recognition.

Hurricane Ida

Although the tribe has survived hurricanes for hundreds of years, Hurricane Ida devastated the Pointe-au-Chien community on August 29, 2021, leaving unprecedented damage with about 150 tribal families in need of assistance for temporary housing and rebuilding. Because of not being a federally recognized tribe, important disaster proclamations and rescue funds were not forthcoming from U.S. government relief agencies.

References

External links
The Pointe-au-Chien Tribe
Louisiana's Pointe-au-Chien Tribe Struggles to Preserve Its Way of Life, Huffington Post, 06/16/2013.

Cultural organizations based in Louisiana
State-recognized tribes in the United States